SS Cufic was a livestock carrier, built by Harland and Wolff for the White Star Line, displacing 4,639 tons and completed on 1 December 1888. She ran the Liverpool to New York route. In 1896, Cufic was chartered to a Spanish shipping company and renamed Nuestra Señora de Guadalupe and transported horses between Spain and Cuba.

In 1898 Nuestra Señora de Guadalupe was returned to the White Star Line and the ship was renamed Cufic. She was then moved to the Dominion Line in 1901, with her name being now changed to Manxman. She was later sold on to a Canadian shipping Line. Manxman was used as a troop transport in 1917 and in 1919 was sold to new owners in New York.

On 18 December 1919, Cufic foundered with all the crew whilst transporting shipments of wheat from Portland to Gibraltar.

References

External links

1888 ships
Maritime incidents in 1919
Shipwrecks in the Atlantic Ocean
Ships of the White Star Line
Ships built by Harland and Wolff
Ships built in Belfast